The women's +72 kg competition in judo at the 1992 Summer Olympics in Barcelona was held on 27 July at the Palau Blaugrana. The gold medal was won by Zhuang Xiaoyan of China.

Results

Main brackets

Pool A

Pool B

Repechages

Repechage A

Repechage B

Final

Final classification

References

External links
 

W73
Judo at the Summer Olympics Women's Heavyweight
Olympics W73
Judo